Arthur Ormiston Cochrane (June 21, 1879 – December 4, 1926) was a Canadian politician. He served in the Legislative Assembly of British Columbia from 1924 to 1926 from the electoral district of North Okanagan, a member of the Conservative party. He died in office in 1926 of heart disease (angina pectoris).

References

1879 births
1926 deaths